Eupithecia gemellata is a moth in the  family Geometridae. It is found in most of southern Europe, as well as the Near East.

The wingspan is 16–17 mm.

The larvae feed on Petrorhagia saxifraga.

References

Moths described in 1861
gemellata
Moths of Europe
Moths of Asia
Taxa named by Gottlieb August Wilhelm Herrich-Schäffer